Hemipsocus is a genus of leaf litter barklice in the family Hemipsocidae. There are about 17 described species in Hemipsocus.

Species
These 17 species belong to the genus Hemipsocus:

 Hemipsocus africanus Enderlein, 1907
 Hemipsocus chloroticus (Hagen, 1858)
 Hemipsocus fasciatus Badonnel, 1967
 Hemipsocus funebris Badonnel, 1969
 Hemipsocus luridus Enderlein, 1903
 Hemipsocus maculatus New, 1973
 Hemipsocus massulatus Li, 2002
 Hemipsocus mauritianus Turner, 1976
 Hemipsocus ornatus Datta, 1969
 Hemipsocus pallidus New & Thornton, 1975
 Hemipsocus parallelicus Li, 1996
 Hemipsocus pardus Smithers, 1964
 Hemipsocus pretiosus Banks, 1930
 Hemipsocus roseus (Hagen, 1859)
 Hemipsocus rubellis Navas, 1934
 Hemipsocus selysi Banks, 1918
 Hemipsocus turneri Badonnel, 1977

References

Psocetae
Articles created by Qbugbot